The South Yemen national football team was the national team of South Yemen between 1965 and 1989. The team took part in the Asian Cup finals in 1976, losing 0–8 to Iran and 0–1 to Iraq. They entered their only World Cup qualification campaign, for the 1986 FIFA World Cup, and were knocked out in the first round by Bahrain.

The team ceased to exist in 1990, when South Yemen united with North Yemen to form Yemen. See the article Yemen national football team for details after 1990.

History

Aden (1965)

The first international tournament in South Yemen was the Football at the 1965 Pan Arab Games, which at the time was Aden Colony (a colony of United Kingdom). The tournament was hosted in United Arab Republic where it was eliminated on the group stage, losing 1–0 to Palestine, 14–0 to United Arab Republic being his biggest defeat, 6–0 to Iraq and 4–3 to Lebanon.

South Yemen (1967–1990)
The first participation of the newly independent, South Yemen, was in the 1972 Palestine Cup of Nations, where in their group, they lost 0–1 against Syria, beat Palestine and Qatar, both 2–1, and in the last round, they lost against Algeria by 1–4.

1976 Asian Cup

South Yemen has only played in the AFC Asian Cup since the 1976 edition, qualifying automatically, due to the other teams having given up playing in the knockout tournament, with the final tournament being held in Iran. They were placed in Group B with the hosts Iran and Iraq. South Yeman lost to Iraq 0–1 and then Iran 0–8 in the group stage.

1986 World Cup qualification (and the decline)
South Yemen competed in qualification for the only time for the 1986 FIFA World Cup in Mexico. They were placed in Group 4 of Zone A in the First Round against Iran and Bahrain. Iran was disqualified before the games were played, due to refusal to move their games to neutral grounds away from the Iran–Iraq War. South Yemen hosted Bahrain on 12 March 1985 and lost 4–1 in Mortayer Yard (now 22 May Stadium), Aden. On 12 April they drew, 3–3, at the Bahrain National Stadium in Manama after leading 3–1. This saw Bahrain advance through.

After that campaign, they would play again three later against Djibouti in a friendly, months later, they played for the 1988 AFC Asian Cup qualification losing 0–1 to Indonesia, drawing 1–1 against South Korea, and in the end losing 0–2 to Bahrain, being at the bottom of the group.

Last participation
The last time The South Falcons took to the field was at the 1989 Peace and Friendship Cup tournament held in Kuwait, where in their group, they lost 0–2 to the Iran, also lost to Iraq but 2–6, and in the last one played by South Yemen, they won 1–0 against Guinea, being his top scorer in the tournament Mohammed Hussein, scoring the 3 goals that the South Yemeni team will score in the tournament.

With the Yemeni unification in May 1990, the South Yemen team was dissolved, and its players migrated to the newly created Yemen, but it was the North Yemen which was considered the legitimate predecessor of the now Yemeni team.

Competitive record

FIFA World Cup record

AFC Asian Cup record

Asian Games

Pan Arab Games

Palestine Cup of Nations

Coaches

Results and head-to-head records

Results Review

Head to head records
Key

The list shown below shows the South Yemen national football team all-time international record against opposing nations.

Player records

World Football Elo Ratings

References

football team
S
Former national association football teams in Asia
1960s establishments in South Yemen
National sports teams established in 1965